Little Diamond Island is an island in Casco Bay, Maine, in the United States.  It is part of the city of Portland, Maine. 

The island was formerly known as Little Hog Island. It is mostly made up of private property, and it is a vacation destination. It can be accessed by ferry from the mainland.

As of the 2000 census, the island had a year-round population of 5. There are few permanent residents because the water supply is turned off during the winter.

See also
 List of islands of Maine

References

Islands of Portland, Maine